Asrat Megersa (born 20 June 1987) is an Ethiopian professional footballer who plays as a midfielder for Ethiopian Premier League club Wolkite City.

Career
As a 25-year-old midfielder, Asrat may not be considered a star by many, but many coaches know how valuable he is. Asrat has been tremendously valuable and a major reason for the results the team has gotten recently. In 2012, he played 7 out of the 11 national team games.

International career
Asrat debuted in 2011 and so far has collected 13 caps.

References

External links
 
 

1987 births
Living people
Ethiopian footballers
Ethiopia international footballers
2013 Africa Cup of Nations players
Hapoel Nir Ramat HaSharon F.C. players
Israeli Premier League players
Expatriate footballers in Israel
2014 African Nations Championship players
Ethiopia A' international footballers
Sportspeople from Addis Ababa
Association football midfielders
Ethiopian expatriate footballers
Ethiopian expatriate sportspeople in Israel
Dashen Beer F.C. players
2016 African Nations Championship players